is Maki Goto's third single. It was released on May 9, 2002 with the catalog number EPCE-5152.

Track listing 
All tracks are written and composed by Tsunku.
 
 Arrangement: Takao Konishi
 
 Arrangement: Mikio Sakai
 "Te o Nigitte Arukitai" (Instrumental)

Performances

Concert 
 Morning Musume Concert Tour 2002 Haru "Love Is Alive!"
 Morning Musume Love Is Alive! 2002 Natsu
 Hello! Project 2003 Winter ~Tanoshin Jattemasu!~
 Goto Maki First Concert Tour 2003 Haru ~Go! Makking Gold~
 Hello! Project 2003 Natsu ~Yossha! Bikkuri Summer!!~ (with Hello! Project Kids)
 Goto Maki Concert Tour 2003 Aki Sexy! Makking Gold
 Goto Maki Concert Tour 2004 Haru ~Makkin-iro ni Nucchae!~ (as part of a medley)
 Hello! Project 2004 Summer ~Natsu no Doon!~
 Goto Maki Concert Tour 2004 Aki Aa Maki no Shirabe (with Atsuko Inaba)
 Hello! Project 2005 Winter All-Stars Dairanbu ~A Happy New Power! Iida Kaori Sotsugyo Special~ (by Hello! Project)
 Hello! Project Akagumi (by Hello! Project Akagumi)
 Hello! Project Shirogumi (by Hello! Project Shirogumi)
 Nochiura Natsumi Concert Tour 2005 Haru "Triangle Energy" (by Natsumi Nochiura)
 Hello Pro Party! 2006 ~Goto Maki Captain Kōen~
 Hello! Project 2007 Summer 10th Anniversary Dai Kanshasai ~Hello! Project Natsu Matsuri!~ (by Momoko Tsugunaga, Miyabi Natsuyaki, Maimi Yajima, Saki Nakajima & Hello Pro Egg)

Television 
 Hello Pro Hour #1 (by Megumi Murakami)

External links 
 Te o Nigitte Arukitai entry on the Up-Front Works official website
 Projecthello.com lyrics: Te o Nigitte Arukitai, Tokutōseki

2002 singles
Songs written by Tsunku
Maki Goto songs
Song recordings produced by Tsunku
2002 songs
Zetima Records singles